Fenua Fala is an islet of the Fakaofo island group of Tokelau.  A settlement Fakaofo was established there in 1960.

References
Map of Fakaofo Atoll

Pacific islands claimed under the Guano Islands Act
Islands of Tokelau
Fakaofo